State Correctional Institution – Retreat is a former 350-bed Medium-Security correctional facility for males. Located on the site of the former Retreat State Hospital, the facility is located  about 12 miles south of Wilkes-Barre in the northeastern part of the commonwealth of Pennsylvania.

Opening of SCI Retreat
Opening of SCI-Retreat was the result of the commonwealth's overcrowding issue of the 1980s. The Retreat State Hospital was declining in  patients and was closed in 1981 and planning for SCI-Retreat's conversion began. Similar conversions were made at Cresson Center (Now SCI-Cresson) and the former Waynesburg Youth Development Center (Was SCI-Waynesburg from 1985-2004). Retreat was the first correctional facility built since 1960. The correctional facility opened in 1986.

See also
 List of Pennsylvania state prisons

References

External links
 Penna. Department of Corrections - SCI Retreat

Prisons in Pennsylvania
Buildings and structures in Luzerne County, Pennsylvania
1986  establishments in Pennsylvania